James William Reid (1917-1972) was an American politician who served as the Mayor of Raleigh, North Carolina.

Early life 
James Reid was born on September 15, 1917 in Asheville, North Carolina to William Ernest Reid and Bessie Perkinson. During his early childhood, he lived across from Thomas Wolfe, who depicted Reid's family in his novel Look Homeward, Angel as the Tarkinton family. Reid attended the then Mars Hill Junior College (now Mars Hill University) and graduated from Wake Forest College (now Wake Forest University) in 1937 with a degree in physics.

Commercial career 
From 1938 to 1942, Reid worked as a staff announcer for radio stations in Asheville, Wilson, Greenville, South Carolina, and Raleigh. In 1942, Reid entered the Naval Air Force for World War II, where he served in the Aleutian Islands for two years and afterwards was a radar officer at Adak, Kodiak, Attu. He finished his service with the Bureau of Ships in Washington D.C. He returned to radio station WPTF in Raleigh as staff announcer, sports director, and weather reporter; in 1958 he became manager of the Raleigh office of WTVD television station. From October 1960 until his death he was senior vice-president of Branch Banking and Trust Company in Raleigh.

Political career 
Reid was sworn-in as the Mayor of Raleigh on July 1, 1963.

Personal life 
Reid married his wife, Mary Elizabeth Davis, on February 7, 1948 in Wadesboro, North Carolina. They had two sons, Michael E and James William Jr., and a daughter, Nancy K.

Death 
James Reid died on June 19, 1972 in Raleigh, North Carolina from a heart attack at the age of 54 years.

References 

1917 births
1972 deaths
Mayors of Raleigh, North Carolina
Politicians from Asheville, North Carolina
North Carolina Democrats
20th-century American politicians
Mars Hill University alumni
Wake Forest University alumni